Youssef Omar Isahak (born 30 October 1969) is a Djiboutian judoka.

Isahak competed at the 1992 Summer Olympics held in Barcelona, he entered the extra-lightweight class and after receiving a bye in the first round he was eliminated by Polish judoka Piotr Kamrowski.

References

1969 births
Living people
Djiboutian male judoka
Judoka at the 1992 Summer Olympics
Olympic judoka of Djibouti
Place of birth missing (living people)